Puerto Madryn is a city in the province of Chubut in Argentine Patagonia.

Madryn may also refer to:

 Saint Materiana (born c. 440), Welsh saint
 Thomas Madryn (fl. 1654), Welsh politician

See also
 Madron, Cornwall, Great Britain